

Events

Pre-1600
 451 – Battle of Chalons: Flavius Aetius' battles Attila the Hun. After the battle, which was inconclusive, Attila retreats, causing the Romans to interpret it as a victory.
1180 – First Battle of Uji, starting the Genpei War in Japan.

1601–1900
1622 – The Battle of Höchst takes place during the  Thirty Years' War.
1631 – The Sack of Baltimore: The Irish village of Baltimore is attacked by Algerian pirates.
1652 – Tarhoncu Ahmed Pasha is appointed Grand Vizier of the Ottoman Empire.
1685 – Monmouth Rebellion: James Scott, 1st Duke of Monmouth declares himself King of England at Bridgwater.
1756 – A British garrison is imprisoned in the Black Hole of Calcutta.
1782 – The U.S. Congress adopts the Great Seal of the United States.
1787 – Oliver Ellsworth moves at the Federal Convention to call the government the 'United States'.
1789 – Deputies of the French Third Estate take the Tennis Court Oath.
1791 – King Louis XVI, disguised as a valet, and the French royal family attempt to flee Paris during the French Revolution. 
1819 – The U.S. vessel  arrives at Liverpool, United Kingdom. It is the first steam-propelled vessel to cross the Atlantic, although most of the journey is made under sail.
1837 – Queen Victoria succeeds to the British throne.
1840 – Samuel Morse receives the patent for the telegraph.
1862 – Barbu Catargiu, the Prime Minister of Romania, is assassinated.
1863 – American Civil War: West Virginia is admitted as the 35th U.S. state.
1877 – Alexander Graham Bell installs the world's first commercial telephone service in Hamilton, Ontario, Canada.
1893 – Lizzie Borden is acquitted of the murders of her father and stepmother.
1895 – The Kiel Canal, crossing the base of the Jutland peninsula and the busiest artificial waterway in the world, is officially opened.
1900 – Boxer Rebellion: The Imperial Chinese Army begins a 55-day siege of the Legation Quarter in Beijing, China.
  1900   – Baron Eduard Toll, leader of the Russian Polar Expedition of 1900, departs Saint Petersburg in Russia on the explorer ship Zarya, never to return.

1901–present
1921 – Workers of Buckingham and Carnatic Mills in the city of Chennai, India, begin a four-month strike.
1926 – The 28th International Eucharistic Congress begins in Chicago, with over 250,000 spectators attending the opening procession.
1942 – The Holocaust: Kazimierz Piechowski and three others, dressed as members of the SS-Totenkopfverbände, steal an SS staff car and escape from the Auschwitz concentration camp.
1943 – The Detroit race riot breaks out and continues for three more days.
  1943   – World War II: The Royal Air Force launches Operation Bellicose, the first shuttle bombing raid of the war. Avro Lancaster bombers damage the V-2 rocket production facilities at the Zeppelin Works while en route to an air base in Algeria.
1944 – World War II: The Battle of the Philippine Sea concludes with a decisive U.S. naval victory. The lopsided naval air battle is also known as the "Great Marianas Turkey Shoot".
  1944   – Continuation War: The Soviet Union demands an unconditional surrender from Finland during the beginning of partially successful Vyborg–Petrozavodsk Offensive. The Finnish government refuses.
  1944   – The experimental MW 18014 V-2 rocket reaches an altitude of 176 km, becoming the first man-made object to reach outer space. 
1945 – The United States Secretary of State approves the transfer of Wernher von Braun and his team of Nazi rocket scientists to the U.S. under Operation Paperclip.
1948 – The Deutsche Mark is introduced in Western Allied-occupied Germany. The Soviet Military Administration in Germany responded by imposing the Berlin Blockade four days later.
1956 – A Venezuelan Super-Constellation crashes in the Atlantic Ocean off Asbury Park, New Jersey, killing 74 people.
1959 – A rare June hurricane strikes Canada's Gulf of St. Lawrence killing 35.
1960 – The Mali Federation gains independence from France (it later splits into Mali and Senegal).
1963 – Following the Cuban Missile Crisis, the Soviet Union and the United States sign an agreement to establish the so-called "red telephone" link between Washington, D.C. and Moscow.
1964 – A Curtiss C-46 Commando crashes in the Shengang District of Taiwan, killing 57 people.
1972 – Watergate scandal: An 18½-minute gap appears in the tape recording of the conversations between U.S. President Richard Nixon and his advisers regarding the recent arrests of his operatives while breaking into the Watergate complex.
1973 – Snipers fire upon left-wing Peronists in Buenos Aires, Argentina, in what is known as the Ezeiza massacre. At least 13 are killed and more than 300 are injured.
  1973   – Aeroméxico Flight 229 crashes on approach to Licenciado Gustavo Díaz Ordaz International Airport, killing all 27 people on board.
1975 – The film Jaws is released in the United States, becoming the highest-grossing film of that time and starting the trend of films known as "summer blockbusters".
1979 – ABC News correspondent Bill Stewart is shot dead by a Nicaraguan National Guard soldier under the regime of Anastasio Somoza Debayle during the Nicaraguan Revolution. The murder is caught on tape and sparks an international outcry against the regime.
1982 – The International Conference on the Holocaust and Genocide opens in Tel Aviv, despite attempts by the Turkish government to cancel it, as it included presentations on the Armenian genocide.
1982 – The Argentine Corbeta Uruguay base on Southern Thule surrenders to Royal Marine commandos in the final action of the Falklands War.
1988 – Haitian President Leslie Manigat is ousted from power in a coup d'état led by Lieutenant general Henri Namphy.
1990 – Asteroid Eureka is discovered.
  1990   – The 7.4  Manjil–Rudbar earthquake affects northern Iran with a maximum Mercalli intensity of X (Extreme), killing 35,000–50,000, and injuring 60,000–105,000.
1991 – The German Bundestag votes to move seat of government from the former West German capital of Bonn to the present capital of Berlin.
1994 – The 1994 Imam Reza shrine bomb explosion in Iran leaves at least 25 dead and 70 to 300 injured.
2003 – The Wikimedia Foundation is founded in St. Petersburg, Florida.
2019 – Iran's Air Defense Forces shoot down an American surveillance drone over the Strait of Hormuz amid rising tensions between the two countries.

Births

Pre-1600
1005 – Ali az-Zahir, Fatimid caliph of Egypt (d. 1036)
1389 – John of Lancaster, 1st Duke of Bedford, English statesman (d. 1435)
1469 – Gian Galeazzo Sforza, duke of Milan (d. 1494)
1566 – Sigismund III Vasa, Polish and Swedish king (d. 1632)
1583 – Jacob De la Gardie, Swedish soldier and politician, Lord High Constable of Sweden (d. 1652)

1601–1900
1634 – Charles Emmanuel II, duke of Savoy (d. 1675)
1642 – (O.S.) George Hickes, English minister and scholar (d. 1715)
1647 – (O.S.) John George III, Elector of Saxony (d. 1691)
1717 – Jacques Saly, French sculptor and painter (d. 1776)
1723 – (O.S.) Adam Ferguson, Scottish philosopher and historian (d. 1816)
1737 – Tokugawa Ieharu, Japanese shōgun (d. 1786)
1754 – Amalie of Hesse-Darmstadt, princess of Baden (d. 1832)
1756 – Joseph Martin Kraus, German-Swedish composer and educator (d. 1792)
1761 – Jacob Hübner, German entomologist and author (d. 1826)
1763 – Wolfe Tone, Irish rebel leader (d. 1798)
1770 – Moses Waddel, American minister and academic (d. 1840)
1771 – Thomas Douglas, 5th Earl of Selkirk, Scottish philanthropist and politician, Lord Lieutenant of Kirkcudbright (d. 1820)
  1771   – Hermann von Boyen, Prussian general and politician, Prussian Minister of War (d. 1848)
1777 – Jean-Jacques Lartigue, Canadian bishop (d. 1840)
1778 – Jean Baptiste Gay, vicomte de Martignac, French politician, 7th Prime Minister of France (d. 1832)
1786 – Marceline Desbordes-Valmore, French poet and author (d. 1859)
1796 – Luigi Amat di San Filippo e Sorso, Italian cardinal (d. 1878)
1808 – Samson Raphael Hirsch, German rabbi and scholar (d. 1888)
1809 – Isaak August Dorner, German theologian and academic (d. 1884)
1813 – Joseph Autran, French poet and author (d. 1877)
1819 – Jacques Offenbach, German-French cellist and composer (d. 1880)
1847 – Gina Krog, Norwegian suffragist and women's rights activist (d. 1916)
1855 – Richard Lodge, English historian and academic (d. 1936)
1858 – Charles W. Chesnutt, American novelist and short story writer (d. 1932)
1859 – Christian von Ehrenfels, Austrian philosopher (d. 1932)
1860 – Alexander Winton, Scottish-American race car driver and engineer (d. 1932)
  1860   – Jack Worrall, Australian cricketer, footballer, and coach (d. 1937)
1861 – Frederick Gowland Hopkins, English biochemist and academic, Nobel Prize laureate (d. 1947)
1865 – George Redmayne Murray, English biologist and physician (d. 1939)
1866 – James Burns, English cricketer (d. 1957)
1867 – Leon Wachholz, Polish scientist and medical examiner (d. 1942)
1869 – Laxmanrao Kirloskar, Indian businessman, founded the Kirloskar Group (d. 1956)
1870 – Georges Dufrénoy, French painter and academic (d. 1943)
1872 – George Carpenter, American 5th General of The Salvation Army (d. 1948)
1875 – Reginald Punnett, English geneticist, statistician, and academic (d. 1967)
1882 – Daniel Sawyer, American golfer (d. 1937)
1884 – Mary R. Calvert, American astronomer and author (d. 1974)
  1884   – Johannes Heinrich Schultz, German psychiatrist and psychotherapist (d. 1970)
1885 – Andrzej Gawroński, Polish linguist and academic (d. 1927)
1887 – Kurt Schwitters, German painter and illustrator (d. 1948)
1889 – John S. Paraskevopoulos, Greek-South African astronomer and academic (d. 1951)
1891 – Giannina Arangi-Lombardi, Italian soprano (d. 1951)
  1891   – John A. Costello, Irish lawyer and politician, 3rd Taoiseach of Ireland (d. 1976)
1893 – Wilhelm Zaisser, German soldier and politician (d. 1958)
1894 – Lloyd Hall, American chemist and academic (d. 1971)
1896 – Wilfrid Pelletier, Canadian pianist, composer, and conductor (d. 1982)
1897 – Elisabeth Hauptmann, German author and playwright (d. 1973)
1899 – Jean Moulin, French soldier and engineer (d. 1943)

1901–present
1903 – Sam Rabin, English wrestler, sculptor, and singer (d. 1991)
1905 – Lillian Hellman, American playwright and screenwriter (d. 1984)
1906 – Bob King, American high jumper and obstetrician (d. 1965)
1907 – Jimmy Driftwood, American singer-songwriter and banjo player (d. 1998)
1908 – Billy Werber, American baseball player (d. 2009)
  1908   – Gus Schilling, American actor (d. 1957)
1909 – Errol Flynn, Australian-American actor (d. 1959)
1910 – Josephine Johnson, American author and poet (d. 1990)
1911 – Gail Patrick, American actress (d. 1980)
1912 – Anthony Buckeridge, English author (d. 2004)
  1912   – Jack Torrance, American shot putter and football player (d. 1969)
1912 – Geoffrey Baker, English Field Marshal and Chief of the General Staff of the British Army (d. 1980)
1914 – Gordon Juckes, Canadian ice hockey player (d. 1994)
  1914   – Muazzez İlmiye Çığ, Turkish archaeologist and academic 
1915 – Dick Reynolds, Australian footballer and coach (d. 2002)
  1915   – Terence Young, Chinese-English director and screenwriter (d. 1994)
1916 – Jean-Jacques Bertrand, Canadian lawyer and politician, 21st Premier of Quebec (d. 1973)
  1916   – T. Texas Tyler, American country music singer-songwriter and guitarist (d. 1972)
1917 – Helena Rasiowa, Austrian-Polish mathematician and academic (d. 1994)
1918 – George Lynch, American race car driver (d. 1997)
  1918   – Zoltán Sztáray, Hungarian-American author (d. 2011)
  1920   – Danny Cedrone, American guitarist and bandleader (d. 1954)
  1920   – Thomas Jefferson, American trumpet player (d. 1986)
1921 – Byron Farwell, American historian and author (d. 1999)
  1921   – Pancho Segura, Ecuadorian tennis player (d. 2017)
1923 – Peter Gay, German-American historian, author, and academic (d. 2015)
  1923   – Jerzy Nowak, Polish actor and educator (d. 2013)
1924 – Chet Atkins, American singer-songwriter, guitarist, and producer (d. 2001)
  1924   – Fritz Koenig, German sculptor and academic, designed The Sphere (d. 2017)
1925 – Doris Hart, American tennis player and educator (d. 2015)
  1925   – Audie Murphy, American lieutenant and actor, Medal of Honor recipient (d. 1971)
1926 – Rehavam Ze'evi, Israeli general and politician, 9th Israeli Minister of Tourism (d. 2001)
1927 – Simin Behbahani, Iranian poet and activist (d. 2014)
1928 – Eric Dolphy, American saxophonist, flute player, and composer (d. 1964)
  1928   – Martin Landau, American actor and producer (d. 2017)
  1928   – Jean-Marie Le Pen, French intelligence officer and politician
  1928   – Asrat Woldeyes, Ethiopian surgeon and educator (d. 1999)
1929 – Edgar Bronfman, Sr., Canadian-American businessman and philanthropist (d. 2013)
  1929   – Anne Weale, English journalist and author (d. 2007)
  1929   – Edith Windsor, American lesbian, gay, bisexual and transgender rights activist (d. 2017)
1930 – Magdalena Abakanowicz, Polish sculptor and academic (d. 2017)
  1930   – John Waine, English bishop (d. 2020)
1931 – Olympia Dukakis, American actress (d. 2021)
  1931   – James Tolkan, American actor and director
1932 – Robert Rozhdestvensky, Russian poet and author (d. 1994)
1933 – Danny Aiello, American actor (d. 2019)
  1933   – Claire Tomalin, English journalist and author
1934 – Wendy Craig, English actress 
1935 – Jim Barker, American politician (d. 2005)
  1935   – Len Dawson, American football player (d. 2022)
  1935   – Armando Picchi, Italian footballer and coach (d. 1971)
1936 – Billy Guy, American singer (d. 2002)
  1936   – Enn Vetemaa, Estonian author and screenwriter (d. 2017)
1937 – Stafford Dean, English actor and singer
  1937   – Jerry Keller, American singer-songwriter
1938 – Joan Kirner, Australian educator and politician, 42nd Premier of Victoria (d. 2015)
  1938   – Mickie Most, English music producer (d. 2003)
1939 – Ramakant Desai, Indian cricketer (d. 1998)
  1939   – Budge Rogers, English rugby player and manager
1940 – Eugen Drewermann, German priest and theologian
  1940   – John Mahoney, English-born American actor (d. 2018)
1941 – Stephen Frears, English actor, director, and producer
  1941   – Ulf Merbold, German physicist and astronaut
1942 – Neil Trudinger, Australian mathematician and theorist
  1942   – Brian Wilson, American singer-songwriter and producer 
1945 – Anne Murray, Canadian singer and guitarist 
1946 – Xanana Gusmão, Timorese soldier and politician, 1st President of East Timor
  1946   – David Kazhdan, Russian-Israeli mathematician and academic
  1946   – Bob Vila, American television host
  1946   – André Watts, American pianist and educator
1947 – Dolores "LaLa" Brooks, American pop singer
1948 – Cirilo Flores, American bishop (d. 2014)
  1948   – Alan Longmuir, Scottish bass player and songwriter (d. 2018)
  1948   – Ludwig Scotty, Nauruan politician, 10th President of Nauru
1949 – Gotabaya Rajapaksa, 8th president of Sri Lanka
  1949   – Lionel Richie, American singer-songwriter, pianist, producer, and actor 
1950 – Nouri al-Maliki, Iraqi politician, 76th Prime Minister of Iraq
1951 – Tress MacNeille, American actress and voice artist 
  1951   – Sheila McLean, Scottish scholar and academic
  1951   – Paul Muldoon, Irish poet and academic
1952 – John Goodman, American actor 
  1952   – Vikram Seth, Indian author and poet
1953 – Robert Crais, American author and screenwriter
  1953   – Raúl Ramírez, Mexican tennis player
  1953   – Willy Rampf, German engineer 
1954 – Allan Lamb, South African-English cricketer and sportscaster
  1954   – Ilan Ramon, Israeli colonel, pilot, and astronaut (d. 2003)
1955 – E. Lynn Harris, American author (d. 2009)
1956 – Peter Reid, English footballer and manager
  1956   – Sohn Suk-hee, South Korean newscaster
1958 – Kelly Johnson, English hard rock guitarist and songwriter (d. 2007)
1960 – Philip M. Parker, American economist and author
  1960   – John Taylor, English singer-songwriter, bass player, and actor 
1963 – Kirk Baptiste, American sprinter
  1963   – Mark Ovenden, British author and broadcaster
1964 – Pierfrancesco Chili, Italian motorcycle racer
  1964   – Silke Möller, German runner
1966 – Boaz Yakin, American director, producer, and screenwriter
1967 – Nicole Kidman, American-Australian actress
  1967   – Dan Tyminski, American singer-songwriter
1968 – Robert Rodriguez, American director, producer, and screenwriter
1969 – Paulo Bento, Portuguese footballer and manager 
  1969   – Misha Verbitsky, Russian mathematician and academic
  1969   – MaliVai Washington, American tennis player and sportscaster
1970 – Andrea Nahles, German politician, German Minister of Labour and Social Affairs
  1970   – Athol Williams, South African poet and social philosopher 
1971 – Rodney Rogers, American basketball player and coach
  1971   – Jeordie White, American singer-songwriter, guitarist, and bass player
1972 – Alexis Alexoudis, Greek footballer
1973 – Chino Moreno, American singer-songwriter 
1975 – Joan Balcells, Spanish tennis player
  1975   – Daniel Zítka, Czech footballer
1976 – Juliano Belletti, Brazilian footballer
  1976   – Carlos Lee, Panamanian baseball player
1977 – Gordan Giriček, Croatian basketball player
  1977   – Amos Lee, American singer-songwriter
1978 – Frank Lampard, English footballer
  1978   – Jan-Paul Saeijs, Dutch footballer
1979 – Charles Howell III, American golfer
1980 – Franco Semioli, Italian footballer
  1980   – Fabian Wegmann, German cyclist
1981 – Brede Hangeland, Norwegian footballer
1982 – Aleksei Berezutski, Russian footballer
  1982   – Vasili Berezutski, Russian footballer
  1982   – Example, English singer/rapper
1983 – Josh Childress, American basketball player
  1983   – Darren Sproles, American football player
1984 – Hassan Adams, American basketball player
1985 – Saki Aibu, Japanese actress
  1985   – Aurélien Chedjou, Cameroonian footballer
  1985   – Matt Flynn, American football player
1986 – Dreama Walker, American actress
1987 – A-fu, Taiwanese singer and songwriter
  1987   – Carsten Ball, Australian tennis player   
  1987   – Asmir Begović, Bosnian footballer
  1987   – Joseph Ebuya, Kenyan runner
1989 – Christopher Mintz-Plasse, American actor
  1989   – Javier Pastore, Argentinian footballer
  1989   – Terrelle Pryor, American football player
1990 – DeQuan Jones, American basketball player
1991 – Kalidou Koulibaly, Senegalese footballer
  1991   – Rick ten Voorde, Dutch footballer
1994 – Leonard Williams, American football player
1995 – Caroline Weir, Scottish footballer
1995 – Carol Zhao, Canadian tennis player
1996 – Sam Bennett, Canadian ice hockey player
1997 – Bálint Kopasz, Hungarian sprint canoeist
2003 – Hans Niemann, American chess player

Deaths

Pre-1600
 465 – Emperor Wencheng of Northern Wei (b. 440)
 840 – Louis the Pious, Carolingian emperor (b. 778)
 930 – Hucbald, Frankish monk and music theorist
 981 – Adalbert, archbishop of Magdeburg
1176 – Mikhail of Vladimir, Russian prince
1351 – Margareta Ebner, German nun and mystic (b. 1291)
1597 – Willem Barentsz, Dutch cartographer and explorer (b. 1550)

1601–1900
1605 – Feodor II of Russia (b. 1589)
1668 – Heinrich Roth, German missionary and scholar (b. 1620)
1776 – Benjamin Huntsman, English businessman (b. 1704)
1787 – Carl Friedrich Abel, German viol player and composer (b. 1723)
1800 – Abraham Gotthelf Kästner, German mathematician and academic (b. 1719)
1810 – Axel von Fersen the Younger, Swedish general and politician (b. 1755)
1815 – Guillaume Philibert Duhesme, French general (b. 1766)
1820 – Manuel Belgrano, Argentinian general, economist, and politician (b. 1770)
1837 – William IV of the United Kingdom (b. 1765)
1840 – Pierre Claude François Daunou, French historian and politician (b. 1761)
1847 – Juan Larrea, Argentinian captain and politician (b. 1782)
1869 – Hijikata Toshizō, Japanese commander (b. 1835)
1870 – Jules de Goncourt, French historian and author (b. 1830)
1872 – Élie Frédéric Forey, French general (b. 1804)
1875 – Joseph Meek, American police officer and politician (b. 1810)
1876 – John Neal, American writer, critic, editor, lecturer, and activist (b. 1793)
1888 – Johannes Zukertort, Polish-English chess player (b. 1842)

1901–present
1906 – John Clayton Adams, English painter (b. 1840)
1909 – Friedrich Martens, Estonian-Russian historian, lawyer, and diplomat (b. 1845)
1925 – Josef Breuer, Austrian physician and psychologist (b. 1842)
1929 – Emmanouil Benakis, Greek merchant and politician, 35th Mayor of Athens (b. 1843)
1945 – Bruno Frank, German author, poet, and playwright (b. 1878)
1947 – Bugsy Siegel, American mobster (b. 1906)
1952 – Luigi Fagioli, Italian race car driver (b. 1898)
1958 – Kurt Alder, German chemist and academic, Nobel Prize laureate (b. 1902)
1963 – Raphaël Salem, Greek-French mathematician and academic (b. 1898)
1965 – Bernard Baruch, American financier and politician (b. 1870)
1966 – Georges Lemaître, Belgian priest, physicist, and astronomer (b. 1894)
1969 – Bishnu Prasad Rabha, Indian artist, painter, actor, dancer, writer, music composer and politician (b. 1909)
1974 – Horace Lindrum, Australian snooker player (b. 1912)
1975 – Suzanne Comhaire-Sylvain, Hatian anthropologist (b. 1898)
1978 – Mark Robson, Canadian-American director and producer (b. 1913)
1984 – Estelle Winwood, English actress (b. 1883)
1995 – Emil Cioran, Romanian-French philosopher and educator (b. 1911)
1997 – Cahit Külebi, Turkish poet and author (b. 1917)
1999 – Clifton Fadiman, American game show host, author, and critic (b. 1902)
2001 – Gina Cigna, French-Italian soprano (b. 1900)
2002 – Erwin Chargaff, Austrian-American biochemist and academic (b. 1905)
  2002   – Tinus Osendarp, Dutch runner (b. 1916)
2004 – Jim Bacon, Australian politician, 41st Premier of Tasmania (b. 1950)
2005 – Larry Collins, American journalist, historian, and author (b. 1929)
  2005   – Jack Kilby, American physicist and engineer, Nobel Prize laureate (b. 1923)
2010 – Roberto Rosato, Italian footballer (b. 1943)
  2010   – Harry B. Whittington, English palaeontologist and academic (b. 1916)
2011 – Ryan Dunn, American television personality (b. 1977)
2012 – Judy Agnew, Second Lady of the United States. (b. 1921)
  2012   – LeRoy Neiman, American painter (b. 1921)
  2012   – Heinrich IV, Prince Reuss of Köstritz (b. 1919)
  2012   – Andrew Sarris, American critic (b. 1928)
2013 – Ingvar Rydell, Swedish footballer (b. 1922)
2015 – Angelo Niculescu, Romanian footballer and manager (b. 1921)
  2015   – Miriam Schapiro, Canadian-American painter and sculptor (b. 1923)
2017 – Prodigy, American music artist (b. 1974)
2022 – Caleb Swanigan, American NBA player. (b. 1997)

Holidays and observances
Christian feast day:
Adalbert of Magdeburg
Florentina
John of Matera
Blessed Margareta Ebner
Methodius of Olympus
Pope Silverius
June 20 (Eastern Orthodox liturgics)
Day of the National Flag (Argentina)
Earliest possible date for the summer solstice in the Northern hemisphere and the winter solstice in the Southern hemisphere, and its related observance:
Earliest day on which Day of the Finnish Flag can fall, while June 26 is the latest; celebrated on Saturday of Midsummer's Day (Finland)
International Surfing Day (third Saturday in June, on or near Summer solstice) 
Litha / Midsummer celebrations in the northern hemisphere, Yule in the southern hemisphere.
Gas Sector Day (Azerbaijan)
Martyrs' Day (Eritrea) 
West Virginia Day (West Virginia)
World Refugee Day (International)

References

External links

 
 
 

Days of the year
June